Viagra is a brand name for sildenafil, used for treating erectile dysfunction.

Viagra may also refer to:
 VIA Gra or Nu Virgos, a Russian-Ukrainian girl group
 "Stay Up! (Viagra)", a 2008 song by 88-Keys

See also
 Herbal viagra, various herbal products
 Viagra Boys, Swedish rock band
 Los Viagras, Mexican drug cartel